Robert Earl Keen (born January 11, 1956) is an American singer-songwriter and entertainer. Debuting with 1984's No Kinda Dancer, the Houston native has recorded 20 full-length albums for both independent and major record labels.  His songs have had cover versions recorded by many musicians, including George Strait, Joe Ely, Lyle Lovett, The Highwaymen and Nanci Griffith.

Although his albums and his live performances span many different styles-from folk, country, and bluegrass to rock- he is most commonly affiliated with roots music. Keen has toured extensively in the US and abroad throughout his career.

Early life and education
Keen was born and grew up in Houston, Texas, United States. As a teenager, Keen was an avid reader who excelled in writing and literature classes. Keen was a fan of the English rock band Cream, and was influenced by country music by artists Willie Nelson, Norman Blake, Jesse Winchester, Flatt and Scruggs, Bill Withers, Gary Stewart, and Jimmie Rodgers.

After graduation from Sharpstown High School, Keen started playing guitar himself shortly thereafter, learning to play classic country covers out of a songbook the summer before starting college at Texas A&M University in College Station, Texas. He graduated with a Bachelor of Arts in English in 1978 and began writing songs and playing bluegrass and folk music with friends, including his childhood friend (and future longtime fiddle player in his band) Bryan Duckworth. During his college years Keen lived with future musician Lyle Lovett.

Career
In 1978, Keen graduated from Texas A&M and moved to Austin, Texas. He performed in nightclubs and live music venues in Austin, including Cactus Cafe, Emma Joe's, Alamo Lounge and Liberty Lunch, Anderson Fair in Houston, and Gruene Hall in New Braunfels. In 1983, Keen won the New Folk competition at the Kerrville Folk Festival in Kerrville, Texas. That same year, he began making his self-produced first album, No Kinda Dancer.

Following the release of this album in 1985, Keen moved to Nashville with his future wife, Kathleen Gray. He signed a publishing deal, a new independent label deal, and signed with a national booking agent. While in Nashville, Keen and Gray worked at Hatch Show Print shop.

Keen returned to Texas in 1987 and released his second album, The Live Album, in 1988, followed by his third album, West Textures in 1989. West Textures featured the first recording of Keen's signature song, "The Road Goes on Forever.” Fellow Texan Joe Ely recorded the song on his 1993 album Love and Danger, along with another Keen song, "Whenever Kindness Fails". Keen's own version of "Whenever Kindness Fails" appeared on his fourth album, 1993's A Bigger Piece of Sky. In 1994, he released Gringo Honeymoon followed by No. 2 Live Dinner in 1996.

Keen has continued to write and record music, while also maintaining a prodigious tour schedule. His 1997 album, Picnic, marked the beginning of his on-again, off-again relationship with major labels (both that album and 1998's Walking Distance were issued on Arista Records, and 2001's Gravitational Forces, 2009's The Rose Hotel and 2011's Ready for Confetti were released on Lost Highway Records). Keen's other albums include 2003's Farm Fresh Onions (Audium/Koch Records) and 2005's What I Really Mean and 2006's Live at the Ryman (both on E1 Music). The producers with whom he has worked on those albums have included John Keane, Gurf Morlix, Gary Velletri, and Lloyd Maines. In 2022, his concert tour was listed as one of the most successful in the world.

His band includes:
Bill Whitbeck — bass, upright bass, vocals
Tom Van Schaik — drums, vocals
Brian Beken — fiddle, acoustic guitar, electric guitar

In January 2022, Keen announced that he would stop touring and performing publicly after September 2022. His final tour was named the "I’m Coming Home Farewell Tour" and the final leg was played September 1st, 3rd and 4th at Floore’s Country Store in Helotes, Texas. Approximately 3,000 people attended the last show on September 4th for nearly two-and-a-half hours.

Discography

Studio albums

Live albums

Compilation albums

Singles

Music videos

Notable Covers

Honors

References

External links
 
 
 
 
 
 Texas Heritage Songwriters Association
 Americana Podcast

1956 births
American acoustic guitarists
American male guitarists
American country singer-songwriters
American country guitarists
American folk guitarists
American rock guitarists
American male singer-songwriters
Living people
Musicians from Houston
Musicians from San Antonio
Musicians from New Braunfels, Texas
Musicians from Austin, Texas
Texas A&M University alumni
Country musicians from Texas
Arista Records artists
MNRK Music Group artists
Singer-songwriters from Texas
Sugar Hill Records artists
Guitarists from Texas
20th-century American guitarists
20th-century American male musicians